The F. R. Schock House is a Queen Anne style house at 5804 West Midway Park in Chicago, Illinois, United States.  The house was built in 1886 by Fredrick R. Schock for himself.  It was designated a Chicago Landmark on January 20, 1999.

References

Houses completed in 1886
Houses in Chicago
Chicago Landmarks